Eunpyeong District (은평구, Eunpyeong-gu) is one of the 25 districts of Seoul, South Korea.

Eunpyeong has a population of 450,583 (2010), has a geographic area of 29.7 km2 (11.5 sq mi), and is divided into 16 dong (administrative neighborhoods). Eunpyeong is located in northwestern Seoul, bordering the Gyeonggi Province city of Goyang to the west, and the Seoul city districts of Mapo to the southwest, Seodaemun to the south, and Jongno to the east.

Kim Mi-kyung of the Democratic Party has been the mayor of Eunpyeong since July 2018.

Administrative divisions

Bulgwang-dong (불광동, 佛光洞)
Daejo-dong (대조동, 大棗洞)
Eungam-dong (응암동, 鷹岩洞)
Galhyeon-dong (갈현동, 葛峴洞)
Gusan-dong (구산동, 龜山洞)
Jeungsan-dong (증산동, 繒山洞)
Jingwan-dong (진관동, 津寬洞)
Nokbeon-dong (녹번동, 碌磻洞)
Sinsa-dong (신사동, 新寺洞)
Susaek-dong (수색동, 水色洞)
Yeokchon-dong (역촌동, 驛村洞)

Transportation

Railways
Seoul Metro
 Seoul Underground Line 3
(Deogyang-gu, City of Goyang) ← Gupabal ─ Yeonsinnae ─ Bulgwang ─ Nokbeon → (Seodaemun-gu)

Seoul Metropolitan Rapid Transit Corporation
 Seoul Underground Line 6
(Mapo-gu) → Susaek → Jeungsan → Saejeol → Eungam → Yeokchon → Bulgwang → Dokbawi → Yeonsinnae → Gusan → Eungam → Saejeol → Jeungsan → Susaek → (Mapo-gu)
(From Eungam to Eungam via Bulgwang and Yeonsinnae is the single direction zone.)

Sister cities
 Canterbury-Bankstown, New South Wales, Australia
 Dadong, China
 Yuhong, China

References

External links 

 Official site

 
Districts of Seoul